Seamax Aircraft is a Brazilian manufacturer of amphibious light sport aircraft (LSA) based in São João da Boa Vista, São Paulo.

History
The company was founded to produce amphibious aircraft in 1997, by designer and engineer Miguel Rosário and located in the metropolitan area of Rio de Janeiro. In 2001 the company started production of the Seamax M-22 based on a proof of concept prototype aircraft that had first flown in 2000. In October 2020 the company opened a factory in the United States, the sol location building the Seamax M-22.

Aircraft

See also
Embraer
Indústria Aeronáutica Neiva
Companhia Aeronáutica Paulista
Aero Bravo
Novaer

References

External links
 Seamax Aircraft Website

Aircraft manufacturers of Brazil
Companies based in São Paulo (state)
Brazilian brands